Sushil Dutta is a Bharatiya Janata Party politician from Assam. He has been elected in Assam Legislative Assembly election in 2006 and 2011 from Lumding constituency.

References 

Living people
Bharatiya Janata Party politicians from Assam
Assam MLAs 2006–2011
Assam MLAs 2011–2016
Year of birth missing (living people)